Saint Leo Church is a historic Catholic church and active oratory operated by the Institute of Christ the King in the Diocese of Columbus, located in the Merion Village neighborhood of Columbus, Ohio. The historic parish was founded in 1903, the current Romanesque Revival church was finished in 1917, the parish was suppressed in 1999, and the church was taken over by the ICKSP in 2020.

History

Founding 
Because of the rising Catholic population on the South Side of Columbus in the early 1900s, Bishop Henry K. Moeller called upon Father Charles Kessler, then the assistant pastor of St. Joseph Cathedral to organize a new parish from the territory of Saint Mary Catholic Church under the patronage of Saint Leo the Great. In November 1903, a tract of land was purchased at the corner of Hanford and Seventh Street from Henry Noltemeyer, and a combination school and chapel was built there, the school being staffed by the Sisters of St. Francis. The parish was declared debt-free in 1910, and the current church building was dedicated by bishop James Hartley on May 16, 1917. After the completion of the new church, the chapel in the first floor of the school was converted into classrooms.

Decline and Preservation 
In 1972, the parish school, which previously had been free, began charging tuition due to declining contributions and increasing costs. Because of declining parish support, volunteer efforts, and financial resources, the school closed in 1997 and the building was demolished in October 2001.

Ciiting priest shortages and declining parish membership, the Diocese of Columbus decided to suppress and merge the parish back into neighboring Saint Mary on July 1, 1999. However, parishioners and the greater community banded together to form the St. Leo Preservation Society to keep the church from being demolished. The group appealed the decision to the Apostolic Signatura, which upheld the decision of the Diocese. Wedding and funeral Masses continued to be offered at the church, and it was also the site of Masses for Korean Catholics in the Diocese. A volunteer caretaker, Mike Wolfe, restored much of the interior of the church and repaired the 2,700-pipe organ in the church, and the Diocese paid for a new roof in 2004 to protect his work.

Institute of Christ the King 
On the 16th of September 2020, the Institute of Christ the King Sovereign Priest, a traditional Catholic order of secular canons announced that it would establish an oratory at the church and celebrate Mass there according to the Tridentine Missal. The opening Mass was said on October 2, 2020, with Bishop Robert Brennan preaching the homily and heralding the opening of the Oratory as a 'great day' for the diocese.

Brennan's successor, Earl Fernandes, visited the Oratory for the first time in February of 2023, offering Pontifical Assistance from the Throne for the feast of Candlemas.

Architecture and buildings 

The church is built in the Romanesque style out of buff brick. The floor of the main sanctuary is of Italian marble, as are the high altar and baldachin. Major repairs to all portions of the church commenced following the closure of the parish. The altar rail, portions of which had been used to build a new versus populum altar in 1976, was restored and re-installed in November 2021. The rectory and priory attached to the church are also in the process of being renovated to provide housing for the priests and canons staffing the parish.

References

External links 

Columbus Neighborhoods Feature on Saving St. Leo's.

Churches used by the Institute of Christ the King Sovereign Priest
Roman Catholic churches in Columbus, Ohio
Roman Catholic churches completed in 1917
20th-century Roman Catholic church buildings in the United States